The CICM Missionaries officially named as the Congregation of the Immaculate Heart of Mary  abbreviated C.I.C.M, is a Catholic clerical religious congregation of Pontifical Right for men established in 1862 by the Belgian Catholic priest Theophile Verbist (1823–1868). Its members add the post-nominal letters C.I.C.M. to their names to indicate membership in the congregation.

The order's origins lie in Scheut, Anderlecht, a suburb of Brussels, due to which it is widely known as the Scheut Missionaries. The congregation is most notable for their international missionary works in China, Mongolia, the Philippines and in Congo Free State/Belgian Congo (modern-day Democratic Republic of the Congo).

Presently, their international name "CICM Missionaries" is preferred, although, in the United States, the congregation is mostly known as Missionhurst.

History
Verbist was a diocesan priest in the Archdiocese of Mechelen-Brussels in the mid-19th century. He served as chaplain to the military academy in Brussels and at the same time as a national director of the Pontifical Association of the Holy Childhood. A compassionate man of God, he led a group of other Belgian diocesan priests who became deeply concerned with the abandoned children in China and with millions of Chinese who lived at that time in ignorance and poverty. The congregation is named after a religious Marian devotion to the Immaculate Heart of Mary and has sought to expand its missionary work in various countries abroad.

Foundation
Verbist's desire to consecrate himself to the life of a missionary seemed on the point of fulfillment when the Treaty of Peking of 1861 opened imperial China to his zeal and that of the little band who desired to accompany him. In 1862 he founded the Belgian Mission in China. On seeking ecclesiastical permission, however, they were commissioned by Cardinal Alessandro Barnabò, Prefect of the Propaganda Fide, to begin their work by founding a seminary in Belgium to supply priests for the beginning mission, and laid the foundations of the Scheutveld College, 28 April 1863, in the Field of Scheut, a short distance from Brussels, so the C.I.C.M. missionaries were also known as Scheutists or Scheut missionaries.

The congregation was born not knowing exactly what lay ahead. In September 1863, the first group of missionaries set forth for Inner Mongolia. In the winter of 1865, Verbist and his four companions arrived in inner Mongolia, which was entrusted to the fledgling congregation by Rome, and where they immediately began organizing small Christian communities. The founding Fathers never imagined that many would follow their footsteps notwithstanding the cost of traveling by sea and in the hinterlands of China. Three years later on February 23, 1868, Verbist died of typhoid fever at the age of 44 in Lao-Hu-Kou.

After World War I Belgium lay devastated and the Missionary Fathers of Scheut decided to establish a centre in a safe location from which they could send out their missionaries. As many Belgian refugees at that time were living in London it was thought that a church in that city would serve the spiritual needs of the Belgian community of London and also become a base for the Order's missionary activities. In 1922 the Church of Our Lady of Hal was established in a hut on Arlington Road in Camden Town while a permanent church was built opposite this site in 1933.

World War II

During World War II, Father Jozef Raskin, ordained in the congregation in 1910, and a missionary to Inner Mongolia in 1920-1934, was made a chaplain in the Belgium army and was a personal advisor to King Leopold III. While he was operating under the code name Leopold Vindictive 200 for the Dutch resistance in 1942, he was captured by the Gestapo, tried, convicted, then sentenced to death and beheaded on October 18, 1943.

Growth

The congregation, however, grew and has a worldwide presence today. Originally a Belgian Foundation, CICM has grown into an international religious missionary congregation of men from different races, colors and nationalities who are dedicated to universal brotherhood.

The Scheutveld priests and brothers have faced severe perils, e.g. the Boxer Rebellion in China, involving the massacre of Bishop Hamer, Vicar Apostolic of South-Western Mongolia, seven missionaries and 3000 Christians; the even greater decimation of their numbers by the Congo climate, not to mention the persecution of the missionaries and their local congregations.

In connection with their missions the Fathers opened a number of benevolent institutions, for example the hospital at St-Trudon, Upper Kassai, for those afflicted with sleeping sickness.

Today, 780 CICM priests and lay brothers are present in Asia: in Taiwan, Mongolia, Hong Kong, Singapore, Philippines, Indonesia and Japan; in the vast continent of Africa: in Congo, Cameroon, Zambia, Senegal, Central Africa, and Malawi; in the Americas: Haiti, the Dominican Republic, Guatemala, Brazil, Mexico and the United States; and in Europe: Belgium, Netherlands, and Italy.

Picture gallery

Historical table

CICM Schools in Philippines

Current 
Saint Louis University, Baguio
Saint Louis College, San Fernando City, La Union
University of Saint Louis Tuguegarao, Tuguegarao City, Cagayan Valley
Saint Mary's University, Bayombong, Nueva Vizcaya
Saint Louis College – Cebu, Mandaue City, Cebu
Saint Catherine's School (Bambang, Nueva Vizcaya)
Maryhurst Seminary, Baguio
Maryhill School of Theology, Quezon City
Maryshore Seminary, Bacolod City
Saint Vincent's School, Bontoc, Mountain Province
Santo Rosario School, Pudtol, Apayao

Former 
Paco Catholic School, Paco, Manila (Turned over to the Archdiocese of Manila)
Infant Jesus Academy, Silang, Cavite 
Cainta Catholic College Cainta, Rizal 
Pasig Catholic College, Pasig 
Saint Louis School, Solano, Nueva Vizcaya (Turned over to the Diocese of Bayombong in 1999)
Saint Joseph's Academy, Las Piñas, Metro Manila (Turned over to the Diocese of Parañaque)
Saint Andrew's School, Parañaque, Metro Manila (Turned over to the Diocese of Parañaque)

References

Bibliography

 Raskin, Albert (1977) 'The archives of the Congregation of the Immaculate Heart of Mary (C.I.C.M.)', History in Africa, 4, 299–304.
 Berg, Leo van den (1994) 'The China world of the "Scheut fathers"', Bulletin de l 'Institut Historique de Belge de Rome, 64, 223–263.

External links 
 CICM Missionaries in ODIS - Online Database for Intermediary Structures  
 Archives of the CICM Missionaries in ODIS - Online Database for Intermediary Structures 

Catholic Church in Belgium
Religious organizations established in 1862
Catholic missionary orders
Roman Catholic missionaries in China
Catholic religious institutes established in the 19th century
1862 establishments in Belgium